Subpsoromic acid is a depsidone with the molecular formula C17H12O8 which has been isolated from the lichen Ocellularia praestans.

References 

Lichen products
Oxygen heterocycles
Carboxylic acids
Dioxepines
Heterocyclic compounds with 3 rings
Methoxy compounds
Lactones